Lebaudy Frères was a French sugar producer based in Moisson, France. In addition to sugar, they also made a series of semi-rigid airships in the early years of the twentieth century, some of which saw service with several European armies.

Operation

Paul and Pierre Lebaudy were the owners of a sugar refinery who, with the assistance of their engineer Henri Julliot as designer, built semi-rigid airships which saw service with the French army, the Russian army and the Austrian army.

They constructed an airship hangar at Moisson, near the River Seine downstream from Paris and were instrumental in the development of airships in the first decade of the twentieth century.

Their semi-rigid airships were considered useful for military purposes and several were ordered by the French War Ministry.

Airships designed by Henri Julliot for Lebaudy Frères  
Lebaudy Frères, Moisson près Mantes (Seine-et-Oise). Builders of pressure airships of the keel-girder type to the designs of M. Henri Juillot (sic). Keel-girder of steel-tubing, forming a rigid understructure. Trim controlled by lifting planes.

References

Bibliography

External links

Defunct aircraft manufacturers of France